Israel and Botswana have official relations though neither country maintains a formal consulate or embassy in the other.  The two countries, nevertheless, have reached cooperate agreements at the government level and there is private sector activity between the two countries.

History
Botswana broke relations with Israel in 1973 but re-established in 1993.

The two countries established diplomatic ties in 1993 after Israel and the PLO signed the Oslo Accords. In February 2012, a Dan Shaham-Ben-Hayun presented his diplomatic credentials to Botswana as an official representative.  However, he is currently based in Namibia.

Economic and educational ties
Six Israeli-centered diamond firms have operations in Botswana's Gaborone Diamond District, apparently employing about 1,000 Botswana citizens.

In December 2012, Ben Gurion University agreed to facilitate a new institution called the Botswana International University of Science and Technology.  BGU will be in charge of teaching and building the university's research capacity.  Students from the African country will also be invited to Israel to complete their studies before returning to build the staff of the university.  According to Israeli ambassador Dan Shaham, "Some 250 students will be selected to begin their studies in the coming months. More and more students and more and more subjects will be added gradually, until it becomes a real university."

Botswana is fighting a severe desertification problem.  Israel has been suggested as a model for combating the problem based on the country's technological developments in agriculture and desalination.

Mr. Richard Anthony Lyons is the Honorary Counsel for Israel in Botswana.

See also 

Foreign relations of Botswana
Foreign relations of Israel

References 

Israel
Bilateral relations of Israel